Rich Mountain, elevation , is the highest point in the Rich Mountain Wilderness of the Chattahoochee National Forest in Gilmer County, Georgia.

Description
Rich Mountain is the namesake peak of the Rich Mountains, a circular-shaped range of mountains located in northeastern Gilmer County. Rich Mountain is located at the center of this range, with ridges and valleys radiating outward from the mountain. Many of these mountains are covered in a deep, black porter's loam. The vegetation in the area consists of second-growth hardwood forests.

U.S. Route 76 runs to the west of the mountain. Rich Mountain's summit is located inside the Rich Mountain Wilderness, as well as the Rich Mountain Wildlife Management Area.

It is also the 21st tallest mountain in the state of Georgia, if using a 160 feet prominence rule. 

The Civilian Conservation Corps built a fire tower on Rich Mountain's summit during the Great Depression; only a stone chimney and fireplace remain standing on the summit.

Hiking
No trails pass over Rich Mountain's summit. However, hikers can climb to the summit by hiking off-trail from Rich Mountain Road, a former logging road running through the Rich Mountains.

See also
List of mountains in Georgia (U.S. state)

References 

Georgia's Named Summits
100 highest peaks in Georgia
Georgia peaks over 4,000 feet

External links 

Topographical map of Rich Mountain

Mountains of Gilmer County, Georgia
Mountains of Georgia (U.S. state)
Chattahoochee-Oconee National Forest